Greek National Road 79 is a national highway in East Attica, Greece. It connects Malakasa with Skala Oropou.

79
Roads in Attica